Street gangs in Liverpool have been in existence since the early-19th century. There were also various sectarian 'political' gangs based in and around Liverpool during this period. Dr Michael Macilwee of Liverpool John Moores University and author of The Gangs of Liverpool states, "You can learn lessons from the past and it's fascinating to compare the newspaper headlines of today with those from the late 1800s. The issues are exactly the same. People were worried about rising youth crime and the influence of 'penny dreadfuls' on people's behaviour. Like today, some commentators demanded longer prison sentences and even flogging while others called for better education and more youth clubs."

History

Late 20th century
In the early 1980s Liverpool was tagged by the media as 'Smack City' or 'Skag City' after it experienced an explosion in organised gang crime and heroin abuse, especially within the city's more deprived areas. At the same time several criminal gangs began developing into drug dealing cartels in the city, including the Liverpool Mafia, which was the first such cartel to develop in the UK. As drugs became increasingly valuable, large distribution networks were developed with cocaine producers in South America, including the Cali cartel. Over time, several Liverpool gangsters became increasingly wealthy, including Colin 'Smigger' Smith, who had an estimated fortune of £200m Christopher 'little Ghost' Warren and Curtis 'Cocky' Warren, whose estimated wealth once saw him listed on the Sunday Times Rich List.

A report in the Observer newspaper written by journalist Peter Beaumont entitled Gangsters put Liverpool top of gun league (28 May 1995), noted that turf wars had erupted within Liverpool. The high levels of violence in the city came to a head in 1996 when, following the shooting of gangster David Ungi, six shootings occurred in seven days, prompting Merseyside Police to become one of the first police forces in the country to openly carry weapons in the fight against gun crime. Official Home Office statistics revealed a total of 3,387 offences involving firearms had occurred in the Merseyside region during a four-year period between 1997 and 2001. It was revealed that Liverpool was the main centre for organised crime in the North of England. In 1999, a prominent "turf war killing" occurred when Warren Selkirk was shot five times and a bag of dog excrement placed in his hand, while his children waited in a nearby car: Glaswegian Ian McAteer was convicted of the murder in 2001.

Notable gangs
The Whitney gang were a notorious family gang from the Anfield district of Liverpool. As of November 2011, all members of the Whitney gang have been jailed for 82 years. The last member to be extradited from Spain was Anthony "Tony" Whitney from his home in Dénia where he got mixed up in another smuggling plot, and was apprehended for smuggling 50,000 tablets of an ecstasy-type substance.

Tragedies
In August 2007, the ongoing war between two rival gangs the ‘Crocky Crew’ and ‘Strand Gang’, caused nationwide outrage when innocent 11-year-old Rhys Jones was shot in the back as he walked home from football practice and died in his mother's arms in the car park of the Fir Tree pub in the Croxteth district of Liverpool. On 16 December 2008, Sean Mercer was convicted of the murder and ordered to serve a minimum tariff of 22 years by trial judge Mr Justice Irwin.

International operations
Liverpudlian organised crime 'firms' are internationally active mainly, but not limited to the drug trade. Crime groups from Liverpool are known for trafficking drugs in the Netherlands and it has also been suggested that distribution networks for illicit drugs within Ireland and the UK, and even allegedly some Mediterranean holiday resorts, are today controlled by various Liverpool gangs.

See also
 Crime in Liverpool

References

 
Organised crime groups in England